Kanae Hisami and Mari Tanaka were the defending champions, having won the event in 2013, however both players chose to participate with different partners. Hisami partnered with Sachie Ishizu, but the team withdrew before their first round was played, whilst Tanaka partnered Makoto Ninomiya, but lost in the first round.

Jarmila Gajdošová and Arina Rodionova won the title, defeating Junri Namigata and Akiko Yonemura in the final, 6–4, 6–2.

Seeds

Draw

References 
 Draw

Kurume Best Amenity Cup - Doubles
Kurume Best Amenity Cup